Fula , also known as Fulani  or Fulah (Adlam: ,), is a Senegambian language spoken by around 25 million people as a set of various dialects in a continuum that stretches across some 18 countries in West and Central Africa. Along with other related languages such as Serer and Wolof, it belongs to the Atlantic geographic group within Niger–Congo, and more specifically to the Senegambian branch. Unlike most Niger-Congo languages, Fula does not have tones.

It is spoken as a first language by the Fula people ("Fulani") from the Senegambia region and Guinea to Cameroon, Nigeria, and Sudan and by related groups such as the Toucouleur people in the Senegal River Valley. It is also spoken as a second language by various peoples in the region, such as the Kirdi of northern Cameroon and northeastern Nigeria.

Nomenclature

Several names are applied to the language, just as to the Fula people. They call their language Pulaar or Pular in the western dialects and Fulfulde in the central and eastern dialects. Fula, Fulah and Fulani in English come originally from Manding (esp. Mandinka, but also Malinke and Bamana) and Hausa, respectively; Peul in French, also occasionally found in literature in English, comes from Wolof.

Morphology
Fula is based on verbonominal roots, from which verbal, noun, and modifier words are derived. It uses suffixes (sometimes inaccurately called infixes, as they come between the root and the inflectional ending) to modify meaning.  These suffixes often serve the same purposes in Fula that prepositions do in English.

Noun classes
The Fula or Fulfulde language is characterized by a robust noun class system, with 24 to 26 noun classes being common across the Fulfulde dialects. Noun classes in Fula are abstract categories with some classes having semantic attributes that characterize a subset of that class’ members, and others being marked by a membership too diverse to warrant any semantic categorization of the class’ members. For example, classes are for stringy, long things, and another for big things, another for liquids, a noun class for strong, rigid objects, another for human or humanoid traits etc. Gender does not have any role in the Fula noun class system and the marking of gender is done with adjectives rather than class markers.  Noun classes are marked by suffixes on nouns. These suffixes are the same as the class name, though they are frequently subject to phonological processes, most frequently the dropping of the suffix's initial consonant.

The table below illustrates the class name, the semantic property associated with class membership, and an example of a noun with its class marker. Classes 1 and 2 can be described as personal classes, classes 3-6 as diminutive classes, classes 7-8 as augmentative classes, and classes 9-25 as neutral classes. It is formed on the basis of McIntosh's 1984 description of Kaceccereere Fulfulde, which the author describes as "essentially the same" as David Arnott's 1970 description of the noun classes of the Gombe dialect of Fula. Thus, certain examples from Arnott also informed this table.

Voice
Verbs in Fula are usually classed in three voices: active, middle, and passive. Not every root is used in all voices. Some middle-voice verbs are reflexive.

A common example are verbs from the root - :
  , to wash (something) [active voice]
  , to wash (oneself) [middle voice]
  , to be washed [passive voice]

Consonant mutation
Another feature of the language is initial consonant mutation between singular and plural forms of nouns and of verbs (except in Pular, no consonant mutation exists in verbs, only in nouns).

A simplified schema is:
 w ↔ b ↔ mb
 r ↔ d ↔ nd
 y ↔ j ↔ nj
 w ↔ g ↔ ng
 f ↔ p
 s ↔ c
 h ↔ k

Pronouns
Fula has inclusive and exclusive first-person plural pronouns.  The inclusive pronouns include both the speaker and those being spoken to, while the exclusive pronouns exclude the listeners.

The pronoun that corresponds to a given noun is determined by the noun class.  Because men and women belong to the same noun class, the English pronouns "he" and "she" are translated into Fula by the same pronoun.  However, depending on the dialect, there are some 25 different noun classes, each with its own pronoun.  Sometimes those pronouns have both a nominative case (i.e., used as verb subject) and an accusative or dative case (i.e., used as a verb object) as well as a possessive form.  Relative pronouns generally take the same form as the nominative.

Varieties

While there are numerous varieties of Fula, it is typically regarded as a single language.  Wilson (1989) states that "travelers over wide distances never find communication impossible," and Ka (1991) concludes that despite its geographic span and dialect variation, Fulfulde is still fundamentally one language. However, Ethnologue has found that nine different translations are needed to make the Bible comprehensible for most Fula speakers, and it treats these varieties as separate languages. They are listed in the box at the beginning of this article.

Status
Fulfulde is an official lingua franca in Guinea, Senegal, Gambia, northeastern Nigeria, Cameroon, Mali, Burkina Faso, Northern Ghana, Southern Niger and Northern Benin (in Borgou Region, where many speakers are bilingual), and a local language in many African countries, such as Mauritania, Guinea-Bissau, Sierra Leone, Togo, CAR, Chad, Sudan, Somalia and Ethiopia, numbering more than 95 millions speakers in total.

Phonology

Consonants 

Vowels 

Short // vowel sounds can also be realized as []. Long vowel sounds can occur as //.

Writing systems 

There were unsuccessful efforts in the 1950s and 1960s to create a unique script to write Fulfulde.

Adlam script 

In the late 1980s and early 1990s, two teenage brothers, Ibrahima and Abdoulaye Barry from the Nzérékoré Region of Guinea, created the Adlam script, which accurately represents all the sounds of Fulani. The script is written from right to left and includes 28 letters with 5 vowels and 23 consonants.

Arabic script 
Fula has also been written in the Arabic script or Ajami since before European colonization by many scholars and learned people including Usman dan Fodio and the early emirs of the northern Nigeria emirates. This continues to a certain degree and notably in some areas like Guinea and Cameroon.

Fula also has Arabic loanwords.

Latin alphabet 
When written using the Latin script, Fula uses the following additional special "hooked" characters to distinguish meaningfully different sounds in the language: Ɓ/ɓ , Ɗ/ɗ , Ŋ/ŋ , Ɲ/ɲ , Ƴ/ƴ . The letters c, j, and r, respectively represent the sounds [], [], and []. Double vowel characters indicate that the vowels are elongated. An apostrophe (ʼ) is used as a glottal stop. It uses the five vowel system denoting vowel sounds and their lengths. In Nigeria ʼy substitutes ƴ, and in Senegal Ñ/ñ is used instead of ɲ.

Sample Fula alphabet
a, aa, b, mb (or nb), ɓ, c, d, nd, ɗ, e, ee, f, g, ng, h, i, ii, j, nj, k, l, m, n, ŋ, ɲ (ny or ñ), o, oo, p, r, s, t, u, uu, w, y, ƴ or y, 

The letters q, v, x, z are used in some cases for loan words. 

Long vowels are written doubled: <aa, ee, ii, oo, uu>
The standard Fulfulde alphabet adopted during the UNESCO-sponsored expert meeting in Bamako in March 1966 is as follows:
a, b, mb, ɓ, c, d, nd, ɗ, e, f, g, ng, h, i, j, nj, k, l, m, n, ŋ, ny (later ɲ or ñ), o, p, r, s, t, u, w, y, ƴ, .

Sample Text 
The following is a sample text in Fula of Article 1 of the Universal Declaration of Human Rights.

Fula: ""

IPA: 

English original: "All human beings are born free and equal in dignity and rights. They are endowed with reason and conscience and should act towards one another in a spirit of brotherhood."

See also
 Pular grammar (a presentation for one variety of Fula)
David Whitehorn Arnott

References

Works 
 Arnott, D. W. The Nominal and Verbal Systems of Fula. London: Oxford University Press, 1970. Print.
 Arnott, D. W. 'Fula'. In International Encyclopedia of Linguistics, vol. 2. W. Frawley (ed). Oxford University Press, 2003.
 McIntosh, Mary. Fulfude Syntax and Verbal Morphology. London: St Edmundsbury Press Lt, 1984. Print.
 Paradis, Carole. Lexical Phonology and Morphology: The Nominal Classes in Fula. New York: Garland Publishing, Inc, 1992. Print.
 Shehu, Ahmadu. Stress Placement Rules in Fulfulde: A Review. Bayero University, Kano, 2014.
 Wilson, W. A. A. (1945). Atlantic. In John Bendor-Samuel (Ed.), The Niger–Congo Languages, pp. 81–104.

Notes

External links 

 Fulfulde Ajami script how to
 Fula- Language Gulper
fulfulde app on googleplay
 Fulfulde Language Family Report (SIL) – includes maps of the dialects
 D. W. Arnott. The Nominal and Verbal Systems of Fula General Introduction webPulaaku
 Listen to a sample of Adamawa Fulfulde from Global Recordings Network
 Adlam alphabet

Fula on the web
Below are some websites from different countries that use the Latin alphabet of Fula/Fulfulde:
 Nigeria:  
 Nigeria: 
 Mauritania: 
 Mauritania: 
 Guinea: 
 Guinea: 
 Guinea: 
 Guinea: 
 Sierra Leone: 
 Fuuta Tooro: 

 
Fula–Tenda languages
Languages of the Gambia
Languages of Benin
Languages of Burkina Faso
Languages of Cameroon
Languages of Guinea
Languages of Guinea-Bissau
Languages of Mali
Languages of Mauritania
Languages of Niger
Languages of Nigeria
Languages of Senegal
Languages of Sierra Leone